Wimereux  is a commune in the Pas-de-Calais department in the Hauts-de-France region of France.

Geography
The river Slack forms the northern boundary of the commune, the English Channel the western. Farming and tourism are its principal activities.

History
At Pointe-aux-Oies, dolmen can still be seen at a Stone Age prehistoric site.

Vauban built a coastal fort at the mouth of the river Wimereux, the ruins showed at low-tide until the 1940s. Napoleon ordered a port to be built here between 1803 and 1804, taking its name from the river. In 1840, the future Napoleon III, first president (and last monarch) of France, landed at Pointe aux Oies.

The territory of Wimereux originally belonged to the commune of Wimille, from which it separated on 28 May 1899. In the same year, the first radio link between France and England was established at Wimereux in March by Guglielmo Marconi.

In the First World War,  Boulogne and Wimereux formed an important hospital centre and until June 1918, the medical units used Wimereux communal cemetery for burials. Lady Hadfield set up and ran a Red Cross hospital here at her own expense for the treatment of wounded and sick servicemen. The Women's Hospital Corps, founded by Flora Murray and Louisa Garratt Anderson, opened their second hospital in Wimereux, on request of the RAMC. It was the first women's hospital to be recognised by the British Army. Colonel John McCrae, the gunner and doctor who wrote the popular war poem "In Flanders Fields", served and died in the hospital and is buried here.

Wimereux was the headquarters of the Queen Mary's Army Auxiliary Corps. In 1916, Solomon J Solomon set up a Royal Engineers establishment, the Special Works Park, in a disused feldspar factory. Here were developed new military camouflage techniques and equipment for the British Army. It became the General Headquarters of the British Army in 1919.

During the Second World War, German Naval Headquarters were situated on the northern side of the town. After D-Day, as Allied forces moved northwards, the town was shelled from Cap Gris Nez, and was re-taken by the Canadian 1st Army on 22 September 1944.

The seaside development was started during the Second Empire, resulting in a remarkable architectural ensemble of houses and buildings typical of the Belle Époque, which are still very well maintained to this day. Originally the secondary residence of wealthy families of Lille and Paris, Wimereux has become a residential suburb of Boulogne and also attracts Britons and Belgians who come to buy holiday homes or settle permanently.

Places of interest
 The church of the Immaculate Conception, dating from the twentieth century
 The nineteenth century chapel of Notre-Dame
 The Villa 'Les Mauriciens'
 The Commonwealth War Graves Commission cemetery

People

 William Morrison Wyllie, English artist
 Lionel Percy Smythe (stepson of William Morrison Wyllie), English landscape artist, lived here from 1879 to 1918
 Alfred Mathieu Giard, zoologist and director of the marine research establishment at Wimereux
 John McCrae, author of "In Flanders Fields", is buried in the CWGC cemetery
 Jack Lang, politician and one-time government minister
 Jean-François Pilâtre de Rozier, aviation pioneer, crashed to his death from a balloon near Wimereux in June 1785
 Maurice Boitel, artist, exhibited here in the 1980s and 1990s

Twin Towns
Wimereux is twinned with the following towns:
  Herne Bay, Kent, England
  Schmallenberg, Germany

Population

Gallery

See also
 Communes of the Pas-de-Calais department

References

External links

 Website about Wimereux (English only)
 Official town website (French only)
 Official Tourist website (French only)
 Official website: Tourism in Boulogne and the Boulonnais region

Communes of Pas-de-Calais
Seaside resorts in France
Pas-de-Calais communes articles needing translation from French Wikipedia
Vauban fortifications in France